The 1881 New Zealand general election was held on 8 and 9 December in the Māori and European electorates, respectively, to elect 95 MPs to the 8th session of the New Zealand Parliament.

1881 was the first time a general election was held under universal male suffrage; all MPs were elected in single-member electorates; and the country quota was introduced, allowing rural electorates to have 25% fewer voters than urban electorates. Beginning with the 1881 election, all elections in European electorates were to be held on the same day, a measure not introduced for Māori electorates until 1951.

1881 electoral redistribution
The previous electoral redistribution was undertaken in 1875 for the 1875–1876 election. In the six years since, New Zealand's European population had increased by 65%. In the 1881 electoral redistribution, the House of Representatives increased the number of European representatives to 91 (up from 84 since the 1875–76 election). The number of Māori electorates was held at four.

These changes necessitated a major disruption to existing boundaries.

The electoral distribution was the first that formally acknowledged the existence of a country quota, where country electorates contained 25% fewer voters than town electorates.

The election
The 1881 election was held on Thursday, 8 December, in the Māori electorates and on Friday, 9 December, in the European electorates to elect a total of 95 MPs to the 8th Parliament. A total number of 120,972 (66.5%) voters turned out to vote. In 11 seats there was only one candidate. 36 and 55 seats were in the North Island and South Island, respectively, plus the 4 Māori electorates.

The incumbent government led by John Hall retained office having support from 45 members with 39 "Greyites" (supporters of George Grey) and 11 Independents not affiliated with either faction.

Results
The following table shows the successful candidate for each electorate.

Notes

References